Greenhorn Mountain is the highest summit of the Wet Mountains range in the Rocky Mountains of North America. The summit of Greenhorn Mountain is the highest point in Pueblo County, Colorado.

Geography
The mountain's habitats are protected within the secluded Greenhorn Mountain Wilderness Area, which is only accessed by a few trails and a 4-wheel drive road on its north.

Name origin
The original name for the mountain peak was Cuerno Verde. The name comes from Cuerno Verde (Green Horn) given by the colonial Spanish of the Provincias Internas to two, father and son, Jupe Comanche band mahimiana paraibo or war chiefs. The younger Cuerno Verde was known to the Comanches  as "Man Who Holds Danger." On September 3, 1779, younger Cuerno Verde, his son, medicine man, four principal chiefs, and ten of his warriors, were killed near Greenhorn Mountain by the men of the expedition of Spanish troops and native American allies (Apache, Ute, and Pueblo) under Juan Bautista de Anza.

On April 4, 1906, the United States Board on Geographic Names decided to use the English translation, Greenhorn, for the name it carries today.

See also

List of mountain peaks of Colorado
List of the most prominent summits of Colorado
List of Colorado county high points

References

Sources
Pekka Hämäläinen, The Comanche Empire,Yale University Press, New  Haven & London 2008, pages 103-104

External links

Sangres.com: Greenhorn Mountain

Mountains of Colorado
Mountains of Huerfano County, Colorado
Mountains of Pueblo County, Colorado
San Isabel National Forest
Sangre de Cristo Mountains
North American 3000 m summits